People's Party (Serbia) may refer to:
 People's Party (1990), a defunct political party led by Milan Paroški
 People's Party (2008), a defunct political party led by Maja Gojković
 People's Party (2017), a political party led by Vuk Jeremić

See also 
 Narodna stranka